Aboubakar Kamara (born 7 March 1995) is a professional footballer who plays for Greek club Aris, on loan from Olympiacos. Born in France, he represents the Mauritania national team.

Club career
Kamara made his Ligue 1 debut for Monaco on 12 September 2014 against Olympique Lyonnais in a 2–1 away defeat. He replaced Yannick Carrasco after 84 minutes. In July 2015, Kamara signed a three-year contract with Belgian Pro League side K.V. Kortrijk, but returned to France only six months later, joining Championnat National side Amiens and helping the club to achieve back-to-back promotions up to Ligue 1. He scored the first goal of a dramatic 2–1 win against Stade de Reims in the last matchday, with Amiens clinching promotion after retaking the lead in the 6th minute of stoppage time. Kamara ended the season as the club's top goalscorer at the 2016–17 Ligue 2 with 10 goals.

Fulham
On 31 July 2017, Kamara signed for Fulham for an undisclosed fee on a four-year contract with an option for another 12 months. He chose to wear the number 47 so that his initials and number would match AK-47. On 23 September, Kamara scored his first goal for the club in a 1–1 draw against Middlesbrough, and three days later, he scored the opening goal in a 3–1 win over Nottingham Forest. On 31 October, Kamara was sent off for shoving Bailey Wright off the ball, as Fulham lost 2–0 to Bristol City. He later scored consecutive braces for Fulham in a 2–2 draw with Hull City and in a 4–1 win over Ipswich Town. On 20 January 2018, Kamara scored the final goal in a 6–0 win over Burton Albion. This turned out to be the last goal he scored for Fulham during the 2017–18 season, as he was used sparingly afterwards, with the rest of his appearances coming off the bench.

On 5 December, Kamara scored his first goal of the 2018–19 season in a 1–1 draw against Leicester City, and three days later, he scored a consolation penalty in a 4–1 loss to Manchester United, after coming on at half-time for Aleksandar Mitrović. On 29 December, against Huddersfield Town, Kamara argued with Mitrović over taking a penalty; his effort was saved by Jonas Lössl. Although Fulham won the match, manager Claudio Ranieri was angered by Kamara's decision to take the penalty, stating: "He did not respect me, the club, team-mates and crowd. I spoke with him, it is not right". Mitrović was more forgiving of Kamara, referring to a similar incident he had while playing for Newcastle United. On New Year's Day, Kamara scored against Arsenal, in an eventual 4–1 loss. During January, Kamara had another altercation with Mitrović in a yoga session at the club's training ground, and as a result, was left out of the team squad for Fulham's match against Burnley. Later that month, Kamara was arrested at the club's training ground on suspicion of actual bodily harm and criminal damage and was "banned indefinitely from all club activities".

Loan to Yeni Malatyaspor
Kamara had been training with the under-23 squad, and, on 31 January 2019, joined Yeni Malatyaspor on loan until the end of the season.

Fulham
Kamara returned to Fulham for the 2019–20 season from his loan spell with Yeni Malatyaspor.

Loan to Dijon
On 1 February 2021, Kamara joined French side Dijon on a 5-month loan deal.

Aris
On 16 August 2021, Super League Greece team Aris confirmed they had signed Kamara from Fulham, for a €3.5 million transfer fee. The 26-year-old scored 17 goals in 94 appearances for the Cottagers after arriving from French side Amiens in 2017. Kamara was part of two successful promotion campaigns, starting both of Fulham's play-off final victories against Aston Villa and Brentford.
On 22 September, Kamara after an assist from Facundo Bertoglio, he scored the only goal in a derby game against Panathinaikos. On 24 October 2021, Kamara scored with a penalty and provided two assists in an emphatic 5–1 home win against Panetolikos. On 6 March 2022, he scored in a 2–1 home win game against Olympiacos, breaking their 25-match unbeaten run.

Olympiacos
On 28 June 2022, Kamara joined Greek champions Olympiacos on a three-year deal.

International career
He made his debut for Mauritania on 26 March 2021 in a 2021 AFCON qualifying match against Morocco.

Personal life
Born in France, Kamara represents Mauritania at international level. He is also of Senegalese descent.

He is a Muslim and fasted for Ramadan even before starting the 2018 Championship play-off final for Fulham.

Career statistics

Club

International
Scores and results list Mauritania's goal tally first.

Honours
Fulham
EFL Championship play-offs: 2018, 2020

References

External links

Aboubakar Kamara at the Fulham F.C. website

1995 births
Living people
People from Gonesse
Citizens of Mauritania through descent
Mauritanian footballers
Mauritania international footballers
French footballers
Mauritanian people of Senegalese descent
Sportspeople of Senegalese descent
French sportspeople of Mauritanian descent
French sportspeople of Senegalese descent
Association football forwards
AS Monaco FC players
K.V. Kortrijk players
Amiens SC players
Fulham F.C. players
Yeni Malatyaspor footballers
Dijon FCO players
Aris Thessaloniki F.C. players
Olympiacos F.C. players
Ligue 1 players
Ligue 2 players
Championnat National players
Championnat National 2 players
Belgian Pro League players
English Football League players
Premier League players
Süper Lig players
Super League Greece players
2021 Africa Cup of Nations players
French expatriate footballers
Mauritanian expatriate footballers
Expatriate footballers in Belgium
Expatriate footballers in England
Expatriate footballers in Turkey
Expatriate footballers in Greece
Footballers from Val-d'Oise
Mauritanian expatriate sportspeople in Belgium
Mauritanian expatriate sportspeople in England
Mauritanian expatriate sportspeople in Monaco
Mauritanian expatriate sportspeople in Turkey
Mauritanian expatriate sportspeople in Greece
French expatriate sportspeople in Turkey
French expatriate sportspeople in Belgium
French expatriate sportspeople in Monaco
French expatriate sportspeople in England
French expatriate sportspeople in Greece